Tom Enberg (born 26 August 1970) is a Finnish football midfielder and forward. He played 5 international friendlies for Finland. He was still active as of 2021 playing for his hometown club Hangö IK. During 1990s he played in Finland's top tier Veikkausliiga for Turun Palloseura and Myllykosken Pallo -47.

References

1970 births
Living people
Finnish footballers
Hangö IK players
Turun Palloseura footballers
Myllykosken Pallo −47 players
Association football midfielders
Association football forwards
Finland international footballers
20th-century Finnish people